Funny Nights with Pearle Maaney is an Indian Malayalam-language comedy chat and game show which premiered on 14 March 2020. It airs on Zee Keralam every Saturday and Sunday at 9 pm and on ZEE5 before TV telecast.

Host
 Pearle Maaney : Malayalam Shows Host, reality shows like Nayika Nayakan, D 4 Dance, Taste of Kerala , Bigg Boss Malayalam on Television and films like last supper, Who, Ludo to her credits. (Episode 1-28)
Suraj Venjaramoodu : National Award-winning Malayalam actor known for Comedy and Character roles along with several Television shows as host( Episode 29-)
Malavika Krishnadas : Dancer, Television host and actress known for Super dancer season 2, Nayika Nayakan, D5 and Indulekha (2020 TV series). ( Episode 29-)
Shweta Menon : Former model, actress and television personality (Episode 48 -)

Cast
Apart from Pearle, comedians like :
 Manoj Guinness
 Sudheer Paravoor
 Binu Adimaly
 Naseer Sankranthi
 Devi Chandana
 Sneha Sreekumar
 Reshmi
 Manju Vijeesh
Are also a part of the show.

List of Episodes

References

External links 
Funny Nights at ZEE5.

Indian television talk shows
Zee Keralam original programming